Peter Delmé (19 December 1748 – 1789) was an English Member of Parliament for the constituency of Morpeth in 1774–84.

Delmé's grandfather was a wealthy London banking figure, Sir Peter Delmé, while his father, also called Peter, served as MP for Ludgershall from 1734 to 1741, and for Southampton from 1741 to 1754.

He was the first husband of Elizabeth Howard (1746-1813). They married on 16 Feb 1769

References

1748 births
1789 deaths
Delme (jr), Peter
British MPs 1774–1780
British MPs 1780–1784